Halaka may refer to:

 Halakha, the collective body of Jewish law
 Halaka (one of the old Persian appellations of the sun). In the "Bundehasb", the sun is spoken of as Halaka, the cock, the enemy of darkness and evil, which flee before his crowing. See also: Alectryon
 Halaka (band), American noise rock band

See also
 Halaqa, an open Islamic discussion forum